Santa Maria d'Oló is a village in the province of Barcelona and autonomous community of Catalonia, Spain. Since May 2015 it has been part of the new comarca of Moianès; previously it was in Bages.

References

External links
 Government data pages 

Municipalities in Moianès